The  (SVB) is a Miocene volcanic belt in southwestern Japan.

References

External links
High andesite in the Setouchi Volcanic Belt, southwestern Japan

Volcanic belts
Volcanoes of Japan